The Stolpersteine in Loštice lists the Stolpersteine in the town Loštice, Czech Republic. Stolpersteine is the German name for stumbling blocks collocated all over Europe by German artist Gunter Demnig. They remember the fate of the Nazi victims being murdered, deported, exiled or driven to suicide.

Generally, the stumbling blocks are posed in front of the building where the victims had their last self-chosen residence. The name of the Stolpersteine in Czech is: Kameny zmizelých, stones of the disappeared.

59 people of Jewish faith were deported from Loštice in 1942, only three could survive. On 21 September 2017, the first eight Stolpersteine were collocated in the city to commemorate the  inhabitants murdered by the Nazi regime.

Stolpersteine

Dates of collocations 
The Stolpersteine in Loštice were collocated by the artist himself on 21 September 2017.

See also 
 List of cities by country that have stolpersteine

External links

 stolpersteine.eu, Demnig's website
 holocaust.cz

References

Loštice
Monuments and memorials